Comox Valley Transit System provides public transportation in the Comox Valley area on the east coast of Vancouver Island, British Columbia, Canada. Service is provided to the City of Courtenay and the towns of Comox, Royston, Oyster River, Black Creek, and Cumberland. Funding is provided under a partnership between the Comox Valley Regional District and BC Transit, the provincial agency which plans and manages municipal transit systems.

Routes
All routes are centered on Courtenay, radiating to the other communities in the area.

References

External links
 Comox Valley Transit System (BC Transit)
 All-Time List of Canadian Transit Systems, British Columbia Communities: Courtenay

Transit agencies in British Columbia
Comox Valley Regional District